College of the Ozarks is a private Christian college in Point Lookout, Missouri. The college has an enrollment of 1,426 and over 30 academic majors in Bachelor of Arts and Bachelor of Science programs.

The college charges no tuition for full-time students due to its student work program and donations. The program requires students to work 15 hours a week at an on-campus work station and two 40-hour work weeks during breaks. A summer work program is available to some students to cover room and board costs.  The college refers to itself as "Hard Work U" and places emphasis on "character" education.

History

Forsyth
The school was first proposed in 1901 as a high school by James Forsythe, pastor of Forsyth, Missouri Presbyterian Church.  Forsythe was from the St. Louis, Missouri area.

The School of the Ozarks opened on September 11, 1907, in a  building atop Mount Huggins (named for brothers Louis and William Huggins from St. Joseph, Missouri who were among the founders of Nabisco and had donated money for the school).  In its first term it had enrollment of 180 with 36 boarders.

From the start, the school adopted its practice of having its students work instead of paying tuition.

On January 12, 1915, the original building was destroyed in a fire. The school temporarily held classes in the Forsyth public school.

Point Lookout
The school then relocated farther up the White River at Point Lookout, Missouri on a  campus. The campus has changed quite a bit since this era, but has remained at the Point Lookout location ever since. The central building of the campus was the Maine Hunting and Fishing Club building, which had been transported to the site by sportsmen from the 1904 St. Louis World's Fair where it had been the State of Maine exhibit.  It was renamed the Dobyns Building in honor of W. R. Dobyns, president of the trustees at the time.  The building burned on February 1, 1930.

In the 1920s what would become the Ralph Foster Museum depicting Ozark heritage had its start in the basement of the boys dormitory: Abernathy Hall.

In 1934 the Fruitcake and Jelly Kitchen opened to offer work for students.  It is now one of 90 work stations.  More than 100 fruitcakes are now baked daily.

1950s expansion

In the 1950s under Robert M. Good and M. Graham Clark the school dramatically changed.

In 1956, with high schools becoming increasingly available in the area, the school became a junior college.

The Museum of the Ozarks took over the entire Abernathy Building and was renamed the Good Museum for president Good.  It was later renamed for country music pioneer Ralph D. Foster, who donated money and exhibits for it.  The museum expanded in 1969, 1977 and 1991. Among the exhibits is an original George Barris 1921 modified Oldsmobile Beverly Hillbillies truck donated by series creator Paul Henning who was inspired to do the show after a Boy Scout camping trip in the Ozarks.  The museum also contains a large firearm display, including a rifle belonging to Pancho Villa.

1960s to present
In 1965 it became a four-year college, it did not garner regional accreditation until the 1990s.

In 1994 it was renamed the College of the Ozarks when regional accreditation was conferred.

The former president, Jerry C. Davis, instituted five goals for the college that now stand as their pillars for students to emulate:

 Academic
 Vocational
 Christian
 Patriotic
 Cultural
According to the school out of over 4,000 applicants, approximately 400 students are accepted to College of the Ozarks each fall semester.  Students are encouraged to have at least a 20 composite on the ACT, or a 1030 on the SAT. A GPA of at least a 3.0 and ranking in the top 50% of their class is also preferred. College of the Ozarks also considers other factors for admission such as leadership, service, and financial need.

Controversies 
The College of the Ozarks has been subject to numerous incidents of controversy, in particular, the school's policies against LGBT people, strict biblical inspired moral code for students, the lack of ethnic and racial diversity, and its boycott on Nike products following an ad campaign featuring Colin Kaepernick. Former LGBT students of the college recounted that they were pressured to undergo conversion therapy, a widely condemned procedure based in pseudo science that claims to be able to alter individuals from homosexuals to heterosexuals.

In 1994 College of the Ozarks was compared to Jonestown because of its lack of academic freedom, this was one of its struggles with getting recognized as an accredited institution.

In the 2003–2004 semesters a professor revealed that one of the college's deans, Larry Cockrum, had received his Ph.D. from Crescent City Christian College, a fraudulent college ("diploma mill") run out of a coach's basement. The professor who brought this information to light was suspended for the 2004 semester, and his contract was not to be renewed for the fall semester. The college's former president, Jerry C. Davis, defended the dean with the fraudulent degree, while terminating the professor. Larry Cockrum has been appointed to a new position as president of The University of the Cumberlands.

In 2017 the College of the Ozarks controversially altered its course requirements for incoming freshmen requiring to enroll in a course titled, "Patriotic Education and Fitness", which combines military style physical education with military science in order to encourage patriotism and respect for the military.

The college has been subject of racial controversies regarding its significantly low number of African Americans in its student body. An article published by The Journal of Blacks in Higher Education in 1993 titled "Blacks Still Not Wanted at Many Christian Colleges" presents a list of every college endorsed by the Coalition for Christian Colleges which were organized according to the proportion of black students to white students, of which the College of the Ozarks ranked second to last. According to the journal, in 1993, black students represented 0.1% of the entire student body of 1541 students. The only Christian college to receive a lower rank was Dordt College in Iowa, which was completely white. Following an ad campaign by Nike featuring former NFL quarterback Colin Kaepernick, the College of the Ozarks officially announced that it would no longer use Nike sportswear for its athletic teams or sell Nike products in the college store.  Anne Branigin of The Root sharply criticized the college's decision, noting the apparent racial overtones of the controversy. In addition, Branigin also criticized the schools work-education model referring to it as "[sounding] a bit like indentured servitude", the lack of ethnic diversity in the student body (approximately 93% of students are white), and the institutions "Orwellian" patriotism guidelines. College of the Ozarks has been described as having a "militaristic patriotism that is at the heart of former President Jerry Davis' claustrophobic educational vision, at S of O we offered our students something much more in keeping with a traditional liberal arts education." All monies earned through the Pell Grant and through campus work is taken by the college, students do not see this during their enrollment, as the institution does not charge tuition.  Cost of education, per credit hour has historically been more than most private or state universities at $310/credit hour, though students are not charged tuition. 

In September 2017, The Princeton Review published the results of a survey of 137,000 students from 382 universities and colleges, which concluded that the College of the Ozarks as being the most hostile and unfriendly campus towards LGBT peoples and non-binary people, in response to the survey Valorie Coleman, public relations director, told the Kansas City Star that "she does not consider the school hostile to LGBT people, but acknowledged its strict rules against sexual immorality."  Homosexual behavior, along with premarital, extramarital, and the consumption of alcohol and drugs is strictly prohibited by the university's student handbook. College of the Ozarks has employed licensed professional counselors who openly practice conversion therapy and leave reparative therapy materials around the therapy office. The Keeter Center Hotel, operated by the College of the Ozarks, states: "The College reserves the right to prohibit events and not extend services to persons or groups that are inconsistent with the College's beliefs and expectations. Though the College will not deviate from its stated position, this provision is not intended to, and will not be used as a way to, exclude or discriminate against persons or groups that are legally protected under state and federal laws as those laws are applicable to the College." The college maintains dormitories that segregate male and female students into different facilities. The college is suing the Biden administration over this interpretation of the law, arguing that "Private, faith-based colleges have the constitutionally protected freedom to separate males and females in dorm rooms, showers, and lockers, and until recently, that common sense policy has been widely accepted and respected", and that the threat of enforcement "forces the college to choose between their religious beliefs or risking massive penalties".

In November 2018, two students of the College of the Ozarks were abducted and sexually assaulted, after arriving to the campus approximately ten minutes before mandatory curfew, the front gate of the college is locked from 1 a.m. to 5 a.m., but students can call a 24-hour security number to unlock the gate.   Though, public relations director Valorie Coleman stated that students are able to call campus security to let them into their residences, former students have been quoted as describing instances where students were expelled following a curfew infraction between the years of 2010 and 2013. 
Alumni have stated that students sleeping in their car or away from campus was routine when they attended the college. Alumni also stated that they feared being expelled for missing curfew.

Presidents
Since 1906, there have been 15 presidents, 2 acting presidents and two chancellors.

1906 – A. Y. Beatie
1907 – George Gordon Robertson
1907–10 – W. I. Utterback
1910 – F. O. Hellier
1911–13 – George K. Knepper
1913–15 – William L. Porter
1915–16 – John E. Crockett
1916–20 – George L. Washburn
1920–21 – Thomas M. Barbee
1921–52 – R. M. Good
1952–75 – M. Graham Clark
1975–81 – Howell W. Keeter, Chancellor
1981–82 – Jim Spainhower
1983–87 – Stephen G. Jennings
1988–2022 – Jerry C. Davis
2022–Present – Brad Johnson

Athletics 
The College of the Ozarks (CofO) athletic teams are called the Bobcats. The college is a member of the National Christian College Athletic Association (NCCAA), primarily competing as an independent (and full-time since the 2021–22 school year) in the Central Region of the Division I level.

CofO competes in ten intercollegiate varsity sports: Men's sports include baseball, basketball, cheerleading, cross country and track & field; while women's sports include basketball, cheerleading, cross country, track & field and volleyball.

Previously, CofO competed as a member of the National Association of Intercollegiate Athletics (NAIA), primarily competing in the Midlands Collegiate Athletic Conference (MCAC) from 1994–95 to 2014–15 (the final season which the conference was later dissolved). Then CofO competed in the Association of Independent Institutions (AII, basically as an independent school in the NAIA) since the 2015–16 school year. In March 2021, mid-season, the former college president, Jerry C. Davis, decided to drop out of NAIA athletics competition (effective immediately during the 2020–21 school year); with no prior warning or discussion with players, coaches, or administrators. The president did not give a reason for the decision.

Basketball 
The 2005-06 men's basketball team won the NAIA Division II national championship, while the Lady Cats were the runner up. The men's team was second in the basketball tournament in 2000 and 2009. From 2000 to 2017, Keeter Gymnasium was host to the NAIA Division II Basketball Championship games. In 2014, Ozarks made headlines by defeating second-ranked College of Idaho in the national tournament.

In the wake of the 2016–2017 national anthem protests at athletic events in the United States, the college announced that they would refuse to play any team whose players took a knee in the same manner as the protests. In response, College of the Ozarks chose to withdraw from hosting the Division II men's basketball champion game and agreed to aide in moving it to another venue. The championship game had been held there since 2000. In September 2018, the president of the college released a statement explaining that the school would no longer use uniforms made by Nike: "If Nike is ashamed of America, we are ashamed of them."

Campus 

Williams Memorial Chapel - This Neo-Gothic chapel was built in 1956 and holds consistent public Sunday services at 11 a.m.
The Keeter Center - The 95,000 square foot facility holds a restaurant, lodging, and other rooms/halls for events. 
The Ralph Foster Museum - This Ozarks' history museum is named after the late Ralph D. Foster, who was a prominent radio voice and philanthropist in the area.
Fruitcake and Jelly Kitchen - The college's kitchen produces many student-made products here, including their well-known apple butter.
Edwards Mill - This student-run mill receives power from a twelve-foot water wheel and produces meal, flour, and other products.
Lake Honor - This small lake found in the middle of campus houses the college's swans and their cygnets.
The Hoge Greenhouse - More than 7,000 plants including orchids, houseplants, and more can be found and purchased inside the greenhouse.
The Gaetz Tractor Museum - This museum holds many antique farm tools, tractors, and pieces of equipment dating back to the early 1900s.
Lyons Memorial Library
McKibben Center
Memorial Dorm
Ashcroft Dorm
McDonald Dorm
Mann Dorm
Foster Dorm
Mabee Dorm
Youngman Dorm
Kelce Dorm
Barrett Dorm
Howell W. Keeter Gymnasium
Tillman Center
91.7 FM KCOZ Radio Station

Notable alumni

Terrence R. Dake, Marine general
April Scott, actor
Tony Tost, writer

References

External links 
 

 
Education in Taney County, Missouri
Educational institutions established in 1906
Buildings and structures in Taney County, Missouri
1906 establishments in Missouri
Universities and colleges affiliated with the Presbyterian Church (USA)
Work colleges
Transnational Association of Christian Colleges and Schools
Bible colleges in Missouri
Private universities and colleges in Missouri